Klaas "Ken" Berkeley (14 October 1929 – 30 July 2018) was a sailor from Australia.  Berkeley represented his country at the 1972 Summer Olympics in Kiel. Berkeley took 16th place in the Soling with Robert Miller as helmsman and Denis O'Neil as fellow crew member. Ken was president of the International Soling Association from 1980 – 1982.

References

1929 births
2018 deaths
Australian male sailors (sport)
Sailors at the 1972 Summer Olympics – Soling
Olympic sailors of Australia